Ondřej Plšek (born 8 January 1981) is a professional Czech darts player who plays in Professional Darts Corporation events.

Plšek qualified for his first PDC European Tour tournament in 2019, when he qualified for the 2019 Czech Darts Open, but he lost in the first round to Keegan Brown without winning a single leg.

References

External links

1981 births
Living people
Czech darts players
Professional Darts Corporation associate players
People from Vsetín
Sportspeople from the Zlín Region